Kjell Henriksen (1 February 1938 – 3 April 1996) was a Norwegian scientist, professor at the University of Tromsø and researcher with a special interest in the polar lights. For his effort in researching the polar lights a new observatory has been named after him, the Kjell Henriksen Observatory on Svalbard.

External links
The Kjell Henriksen Observatory
A presentation of optical measurements of aurora at Svalbard noting Henriksen's efforts

1938 births
1996 deaths
Norwegian physicists